BMV  may refer to:
 of the Blessed Virgin Mary (mother of Jesus)
, Mexican Stock Exchange
Brome mosaic virus
Bureau of Motor Vehicles
ISO 639-3 language code for the Bum language
IATA airport code for Buôn Ma Thuột Airport, Vietnam
Bergen Mekaniske Verksted, a shipyard in Norway
Balloon mitral valvotomy, intervention done in mitral stenosis
Below Market Value, in relation to property (real estate) for sale. 
 An approximate pronunciation of BMW in the German language.